Taekwondo at the 2017 Islamic Solidarity Games was held in Baku Sports Hall, Baku, Azerbaijan from 16 May to 18 May 2017.

Medalists

Men

Women

Medal table

References

Official Results

External links
Official website

2017 Islamic Solidarity Games
Islamic Solidarity Games
2017
Taekwondo in Azerbaijan